John Moore (September 8, 1793 – September 23, 1866), nicknamed "Honest John", was an English American politician who served as Lieutenant Governor of Illinois. He also served in the Mexican–American War as lieutenant colonel and was later elected Illinois Treasurer.

Biography
John Moore was born in Lincolnshire, England on September 8, 1793. An orphan for most of his childhood, he immigrated to the United States when he was twenty years old. After briefly living in Virginia, Moore settled in Hamilton County, Ohio. In 1830, he again headed westward to Randolph Township, McLean County, Illinois and became a wheelwright. A year later, he was elected a justice of the peace. Moore quickly rose to prominence in the Democratic Party, and by 1836, he was elected to the Illinois House of Representatives. He served two two-year terms before Moore was elected to the Illinois Senate, serving one two-year term. In 1842, he was put forth as the Democratic nominee for Lieutenant Governor of Illinois with Adam W. Snyder, who died before election day. Moore was elected, defeating W. H. Henderson by seven thousand votes, and served under Governor Thomas Ford. He was the chairman of the Illinois Democratic Committee from 1846 to 1848.

After Moore's Lieutenant Governor term expired, he enlisted in the 4th Regiment of Illinois Volunteers for the Mexican–American War. He was named lieutenant colonel, second-in-command under Edward Dickinson Baker. Moore led the A, F, and G companies in the Siege of Veracruz, one of the first groups to land ashore. Upon his return to Illinois in 1848, he was elected Illinois Treasurer, serving for seven years. Moore was a leading candidate for the Democratic nomination for Illinois Governor in 1856, but William Alexander Richardson was instead put forth. Moore was the lone Democrat serving as state officer, and was re-elected as treasurer that year.  His work in this position earned him the nickname "Honest John Moore". He reprised his role as chairman of the Illinois Democratic Committee from 1858 to 1860, then again from 1862 until his death on September 23, 1866.

References

1793 births
1866 deaths
Democratic Party Illinois state senators
Lieutenant Governors of Illinois
Democratic Party members of the Illinois House of Representatives
State treasurers of Illinois
19th-century American politicians